Hammer is an unincorporated community in Roberts County, in the U.S. state of South Dakota.

History
A post office called Hammer was established in 1915, and remained in operation until 1973. The community was named after Gunder and Iver Hammer, the original owners of the town site.

References

Unincorporated communities in Roberts County, South Dakota
Unincorporated communities in South Dakota